Cryptocarya glaucescens, commonly known as jackwood, is a rainforest tree of the laurel family growing in eastern Australia.

Taxonomy
Cryptocarya glaucescens was one of the many species first described by Scottish botanist Robert Brown in his 1810 work Prodromus Florae Novae Hollandiae. Common names include jackwood, native laurel, brown beech, brown laurel, bolly laurel and silver sycamore.

Description 

Cryptocarya glaucescens is a medium-sized tree to 35 metres tall and 90 cm in trunk diameter.

Bark, trunk and leaves 

The bark is dark brown or reddish brown and often scaly. Surface not smooth with many irregularities. Bark can contain circular depressions, colloquially known as "bollies", which are also seen in the related laurel, Litsea reticulata. The trunk may or may not be cylindrical, and the base is usually buttressed in large trees.

Leaves are alternate and elliptical, 6 to 13 cm long. Upper surface green, underside a glaucous bluish grey. Hence the species name of Cryptocarya glaucescens. Midrib and lateral nerves and net veins are visible on both sides of the leaf, but more obvious beneath.

Flowers, fruit and germination 

Flowers appear from October to December, being cream or pale green. Flowers are small and numerous in panicles. These panicles may be shorter or longer than the leaves.

The fruit is a drupe. Black and shiny, of an appealing oblong or spherical shape. With vertical lines and wrinkles. 18 mm long and 15 mm deep. The aril has a unique, tangy and pleasant scent. Fruit eaten by rainforest birds including the topknot pigeon. Fruit ripe from March to June.

Unlike most Australian Cryptocarya fruit, removal of the fleshy aril is not particularly advised to assist seed germination, as the aril is so thin. Roots and shoots usually appear within three to six months.

Distribution and habitat 

Very common in warm temperate rainforest areas, but often seen in the other rainforest types. It grows from Mount Dromedary (36° S) in southern New South Wales to Eungella National Park (20° S), in tropical Queensland.

Uses 

Timber is pale brown. Sapwood not attacked by powder post borer.

Gallery

References

External links

Trees of Australia
Flora of New South Wales
Flora of Queensland
Laurales of Australia
glaucescens
Plants described in 1810
Taxa named by Robert Brown (botanist, born 1773)